The Boys' doubles tournament of the 2017 European Junior Badminton Championships was held from April 11–16. Dane doubles Alexander Bond and Joel Eipe clinched this title in the last edition. French Thom Gicquel / Toma Junior Popov leads the seedings this year.

Seeded 

 Thom Gicquel / Toma Junior Popov (gold medalist)
 Robert Cybulski / Paweł Śmiłowski (bronze medalists)
 Nhat Nguyen / Paul Reynolds (quarter-finals)
 Christopher Grimley / Matthew Grimley (quarter-finals)
 Adam Gozzi / Carl Harrbacka (second round)
 Rodion Alimov / Pavel Kotsarenko (second round)
 Petr Beran / Ondřej Král (quarter-finals)
 Thomas Baures / Léo Rossi (second round)

Draw

Finals

Section 1

Section 2

Section 3

Section 4

External links 
Main Draw

European Junior Badminton Championships